Daniel Béguin is a French politician and a member of The Greens-Europe Écologie.

He is regional vice-president in Lorraine. In 2009, he was selected to be The Greens-Europe Écologie's candidate in Lorraine for the 2010 regional elections.

References

Year of birth missing (living people)
Living people
French politicians
Place of birth missing (living people)